The Rapides Parish Coliseum (often called the Rapides Coliseum, as noted on the sign out front) is a multi-purpose arena located on Louisiana Highway 28 West in Alexandria, Louisiana. The coliseum can seat up to 10,000  people in the  building. Additional space is in the smaller Exhibition Hall, also on the property. Built in 1965 by Buddy Tudor's family-owned construction company in Pineville with foreman Pete Honeycutt along with the senior Tudor directing the construction. The dome-topped coliseum has hosted thousands of events, including music concerts, "monster" truck shows, professional wrestling, trade shows and sporting events.

Additional facilities on the grounds include a  Exhibition Hall often used for trade shows.

Arena information
The arena was first constructed in 1964 and completed in 1965. The coliseum property contains a 2,500 lot parking space.

Anthony S. "Tony" D'Angelo (1917-2012), an Alexandria native, was named in the spring of 1969 as the manager of the Coliseum. After thirty years as an officer in the United States Navy, in which he reached the rank of lieutenant commander, D'Angelo returned home to take over management of the facility and served in that capacity through most of the 1970s. He was then named the Alexandria municipal public works director under then Mayor Carroll E. Lanier, upon the retirement for health reasons of the previous director, Malcolm Hebert.

Beginning September 1, 2017, a private firm called SMG will assume management of the Coliseum; the company was actually in place a month earlier in preparation for the transition. SMG has a five-year contract to run the facility. With the Rapides Parish Jury's decision to allow SMG to take over operations for the Coliseum, the officials held a special meeting on August 11, 2017, and voted to dissolve the Coliseum Authority. Rapides Parish officials contend that SMG can offer better incentives to promoters so that a smaller market like Alexandria can land quality entertainment. The company manages eleven facilities in Louisiana, including the Mercedes-Benz Superdome in New Orleans and the CenturyLink Center in Bossier City.

2017 Renovations
In October 2008, a report was produced for the Rapides Parish Police Jury that estimates the total cost of repairs and needed updates to be $10 million. On November 6, 2012, Rapides Parish voters approved a $23 million bond issue back by a $2.5 million property tax for the coliseum. Also approved was a $1 million tax to pay for the coliseum maintenance and operations for a period of 20 years. The $23 million taxes would pay for renovation projects that included an expanded seating capacity, a new 3-story lobby, sky boxes and exhibition hall, improved electrical systems and roofing, new rest rooms, stages, dressing rooms, and a basketball floor, and a rebuilt parking space. The coliseum also features a new center-hung video display. The renovation was designed to give the coliseum a modern appeal and attract larger events for the Rapides Parish area.

Start of construction for the project was delayed due to the Rapides Parish Police Jury's difficulty of obtaining a permit to begin the renovations because of dispute between them and the city of Alexandria over the Rapides Parish Coliseum parking lot issue which was eventually settled. The project officially began in April 2015. Renovation was completed and the coliseum held their grand opening on February 10, 2017.

Seating capacity
The arena as a concert venue can seat 8,000 for end-stage shows and 10,000 for a center-stage shows. For open floor shows, the arena can seat 7,000. For basketball games, the venue can seat 8,900.

The maximum seating capacity history for the venue has gone as follows:
6,512 (1965–2017)
10,000 (2017–present)

Events

Sports
The LSUA Generals Men's and Women's basketball teams played their first ever home game in the coliseum on February 16, 2017, against the St. Thomas Celts. Peak attendance was reached the Men's game with 2,722 fans. This was the coliseum's first event held there since its closure for renovations. The Men's team defeated St. Thomas 80-75 and the Women's team won 80-50.

Future Sports
The coliseum will host the men's and women's Red River Athletic Conference basketball tournament on March 2–4, 2017. This will be the first time the RRAC's tournament since going to a single site format in 2001 is played outside the state of Texas.

Former sports
Past sports teams based at the Rapides Coliseum include the Louisiana Rangers, a member of the IPFL, and the Alexandria Warthogs, a member of the WPHL. The coliseum also has hosted the Louisiana High School Athletic Association basketball state championships.

Other events 
The coliseum was home to the annual Rapides Parish Fair every October from 1960 to 2013. In 2014, the fair moved to the LSUA Ag center on U.S. Route 71 just south of Alexandria.

Some of the site's more famous visitors include Lipizzan stallions (1973), Elvis Presley (1977), Holiday on Ice, the Rev. Martin Luther King Jr. (1966), Ronald Reagan (1975), George Wallace Jr. (1976).

In 2005, the facility was used as a shelter by the American Red Cross after Hurricane Katrina and during Hurricane Rita. It was during Rita that it lost power and water for a short period of time.

Recent events staged at the site include the Barnum and Bailey Circus on Dec. 2, 2008, World Wrestling Entertainment in January 2009, and the Gaither Homecoming Tour on March 7, 2009.

Gallery

See also
List of convention centers in the United States
List of music venues

References 

Basketball venues in Louisiana
Convention centers in Louisiana
Indoor arenas in Louisiana
Indoor ice hockey venues in Louisiana
Music venues in Louisiana
Sports venues in Alexandria, Louisiana
Sports venues in Louisiana
Sports venues completed in 1965
1965 establishments in Louisiana